Carlisle Racecourse is a thoroughbred horse racing venue located in the village of Blackwell just outside Carlisle in Cumbria, England. The course has been on its present site since 1904, when it moved there from the area known as The Swifts close to the centre of Carlisle. The course is 1 mile and 4 furlongs (2.41 km) in circumference, right-handed, and hosts flat racing in the summer and National Hunt racing over the winter months. The last half mile is up a steep incline. The going can get very heavy in the winter.

History was made on 2 July 1929 when the newly formed Totalisator Board operated their pool betting system for the first time on a British racecourse at Carlisle.

Carlisle is home to the Carlisle Bell, one of the oldest horse races in existence. Held annually at Carlisle Racecourse in June alongside the Cumberland Plate, the race is run over 7 furlongs and 173 yards, and although the Bell is presented ceremoniously to the winner, it is actually kept in the nearby Carlisle Guildhall Museum. The Carlisle Bell has only twice been amended – with it being run in Thirsk in 2001, and cancelled in 2020 due to the COVID-19 pandemic. Carlisle also had a King's Plate – a race for 5-year-old horses in 3-mile heats – instigated by George III in 1763.
 

The Carlisle Gold Bell is inscribed with ‘The sweftes horse thes bel to take for mi lade Daker sake’, which translates to modern day English as ‘The swiftest horse may claim this bell in Lady Dacre’s name’. It continues to be given away as a prize for an annual race even today, making it one of the UK's oldest, and most prestigious, races.

Notable races

Other races
Cumberland Chase
Cumberland Plate
Graduation Chase

References

External links 
Carlisle Racecourse (Official website)
Course guide on GG.COM
Course guide on Drawbias.com
Course guide on At The Races

 
Horse racing venues in England
Sports venues in Cumbria
Carlisle, Cumbria
Sports venues completed in 1904